Pasadena City Board of Education v. Spangler, 427 U.S. 424 (1976), was a United States Supreme Court case.

Parties and litigants

Fred Okrand argued the cause and filed a brief for respondents Spangler et al. Solicitor General Bork argued the cause for the United States. With him on the brief were Assistant Attorney General Pottinger, Deputy Solicitor General Wallace, and Brian K. Landsberg.

Raymond B. Witt, Jr., filed a brief for the Board of Education of Chattanooga, Tenn., as amicus curiae. [427 U.S. 424, 427]

References

External links
 

United States Supreme Court cases
United States Supreme Court cases of the Burger Court
1976 in United States case law
United States school desegregation case law
Pasadena Unified School District